This article lists the winners of the annual end-of-season awards in the Scottish Football League (SFL).

The end-of-season annual awards were made by the Scottish Football League (SFL) until the league ceased operating after the end of the 2012–13 season. The awards were presented by the various sponsors of the Scottish Football League (SFL), including Bell's (1994–1998 and 1999–2006) and Irn-Bru (2007–2013).

Winners

Before 1998

1998–2006

2007–2013

See also
Scottish Football League monthly awards
Scottish Premier League Yearly Awards
Scottish Professional Football League yearly awards

References 

Awards
Scottish football trophies and awards
Awards disestablished in 2013